Lubbers may refer to:

Ruud Lubbers (1939–2018), Dutch politician
Rudie Lubbers (b. 1945), Dutch Olympic boxer